The 2015 Red Rock Pro Open was a professional tennis tournament played on outdoor hard courts. It was the seventh edition of the tournament and part of the 2015 ITF Women's Circuit, offering a total of $50,000 in prize money. It took place in Las Vegas, United States, on 28 September–4 October 2015.

Singles main draw entrants

Seeds 

 1 Rankings as of 21 September 2015

Other entrants 
The following players received wildcards into the singles main draw:
  Lauren Albanese
  Melanie Oudin
  Alexandra Stevenson
  Yang Zi

The following players received entry from the qualifying draw:
  Robin Anderson
  Antonia Lottner
  Shérazad Reix
  Amra Sadiković

The following player received entry by a lucky loser spot:
  Anna Zaja

The following player received entry by a protected ranking:
  Lisa Whybourn

The following player received entry by a special exempt:
  Michaëlla Krajicek

Champions

Singles

 Michaëlla Krajicek def.  Shelby Rogers, 6–3, 6–1

Doubles

 Julia Boserup /  Nicole Gibbs def.  Paula Cristina Gonçalves /  Sanaz Marand, 6–3, 6–4

External links 
 2015 Red Rock Pro Open at ITFtennis.com
 

2015 ITF Women's Circuit
 
Redrock
2015
September 2015 sports events in the United States
2015 in sports in Nevada
October 2015 sports events in the United States